Le Silence de la Mer is a 2004 French-Belgian TV drama film directed by Pierre Boutron, based on the 1942 book of the same name by Jean Bruller (published clandestinely under the pen name "Vercors"), and starring Thomas Jouannet, Julie Delarme and Michel Galabru. The story takes place in 1941 during World War II, and concerns the relationship of a Frenchman and his granddaughter with a German captain, who occupies their house during the German occupation of France.

Plot
France, 1941. During the Nazi Occupation of France, Werner von Ebrennac, a German Wehrmacht captain requests the house of a man and his granddaughter, Jeanne Larosière, a young piano teacher, to lodge with them. The officer, passionate about French culture, speaks perfect French and is also a classical pianist and composer. Every evening he shares his ideals and his passion for France with his hosts, who oppose him with a fierce and unshakable silence, the only way for them to mark their hostility to the German occupation. Jeanne tries to ignore Werner, but the German officer soon infatuates her.

Cast
 Thomas Jouannet as Captain Werner von Ebrennac
 Julie Delarme as Jeanne Larosière
 Michel Galabru as André Larosière
 Marie Bunel as Marie
 Timothée Ferrand as Pierre
 Jean-Baptiste Puech as Pascal
 Jörg Schnass as le premier officier
 Jörn Cambreleng as le second officier
 Franck Beckmann as l'ordonnance du capitaine Werner Von Ebrennac
 Alexander Ashkenazy as François
 Hélène Vauquois as la mère de François
 Lucie Barret as Solange
 Jean Philippe Mesmain as le père de Solange
 Claude Andrzejewski as Louis

Awards

References

External links
 

2004 films
French television films
Belgian television films
2000s French-language films
2004 romantic drama films
2000s war drama films
French war drama films
Belgian war drama films
French romantic drama films
Films based on French novels
French World War II films
Belgian World War II films
Films set in France
Films shot in France
French-language Belgian films
2000s French films